Aïn Draham is a city in northwestern Tunisia in the Jendouba Governorate, situated 25 kilometers south of Tabarka near the border with Algeria. Historically a military outpost, summer resort and souq, today it is a regional economic hub.

The city is the capital of a delegation of 40,372 inhabitants. The city itself has an estimated population of 10,843 inhabitants (according to the census of 2004). It is located at an altitude of 800 meters on the slopes of the Djebel Bir (1014 m), one of the Kroumirie mountains. The city is located in one of the most humid areas of Tunisia and holds the record for the highest average rainfall at 1534 mm per year. Rainfalls are one of the major factors influencing landslides, often occurring in this area.

Its name describes the sulfurous hot springs in the area used by the Romans in antiquity. Ruins of Roman baths are also found in the area.

History 
Aïn Draham was originally a French military base

In 1930, it became a multi-purpose tourist resort intended to retain the French colonists guesthouse, residences, administrative tourism, etc.). The forest situation of the city and its colonial heritage (architecture, tile s reds and Tunisian crafts offers it advantages for interior tourism: thermal comfort summer, a wealth  game, in particular in wild boar s, hiking, equestrian or MTB trails, green tourism and sports and the hydrotherapy.

Gallery

Climate

References

Populated places in Jendouba Governorate
Communes of Tunisia
Spa towns in Tunisia